The Maximum Degree-and-Diameter-Bounded Subgraph problem (MaxDDBS) is a problem in graph theory.

Given a connected host graph G, an upper bound for the degree d, and an upper bound for the diameter k, we look for the largest subgraph S of G with maximum degree at most d and diameter at most k. 

This problem is also referred to as the Degree-Diameter Subgraph Problem, as it contains the degree diameter problem as a special case (namely, by taking a sufficiently large complete graph as a host graph). Despite being a natural generalization of the Degree-Diameter Problem, MaxDDBS only began to be investigated in 2011, while research in the Degree-Diameter Problem has been active since the 1960s. Regarding its computational complexity, the problem is NP-hard, and not in APX (i.e. it cannot be approximated to within a constant factor in polynomial time).

References 
  The MaxDDBS page in Combinatorics Wiki
 A.Dekker, H.Perez-Roses, G.Pineda-Villavicencio, and P.Watters. The Maximum Degree & Diameter-Bounded Subgraph and its Applications. Journal of Mathematical Modelling and Algorithms, 2012. DOI: 10.1007/s10852-012-9182-8
 M.Miller, H.Perez-Roses, and J.Ryan. The Maximum Degree and Diameter Bounded Subgraph in the Mesh. Discrete Applied Mathematics, 2012. DOI: 10.1016/j.dam.2012.03.035

Computational problems in graph theory